The whiskered myiobius or bearded flycatcher (Myiobius barbatus) is a species of bird in the family Tityridae, having previously been included in Tyrannidae.  A number of taxonomic authorities continue to place with the flycatchers. The whiskered myiobius is found in Brazil, Colombia, Ecuador, French Guiana, Guyana, Peru, Suriname, and Venezuela. Its natural habitats are subtropical or tropical moist lowland forests and heavily degraded former forest.

Subspecies
Six subspecies are recognised; M. b. semiflavus from east and central Colombia; M. b. barbatus from southeastern Colombia to northern Peru, south Venezuela, the Guianas and northern Brazil; M. b. amazonicus from eastern Peru and western Brazil; M. b. insignis from northeastern Brazil, south of the River Amazon; M. b. mastacalis from southeastern Brazil, south of the River Amazon. The subspecies M. b. mastacalis is sometimes split as the yellow-rumped myiobius (Myiobius mastacalis).

Description
The whiskered myiobius is very similar in appearance to several closely related species. It has olive upper parts, an obvious yellow rump and a usually well-concealed yellow patch on the crown. The rictal bristles round the beak are long and form a basket-like structure. The underparts are greyish-olive and the belly pale yellow. The tail is black and somewhat rounded. It is usually a silent bird, but sometimes utters a staccato "psik".

Distribution and habitat
The species is widely distributed in tropical South America. It is found in the Amazon basin in the northern half of Brazil, northeastern Peru, eastern Ecuador, eastern Colombia, southern Venezuela, Guyana, Suriname and French Guiana. It is more often found in the middle of forests than is the black-tailed myiobius (M. atricaudus), and in Amazonia occurs at lower elevations than the tawny-breasted myiobius (M. villosus).

Ecology
Like other myiobius, the diet consists largely of insects, many of which are caught aerobatically on the wing. It often forages in small mixed flocks. When perched, this bird often droops its wings and fans the feathers of the tail in a manner reminiscent of Old World fantails (Rhipidura).

Status
No particular threats facing this bird have been identified. It is generally uncommon, but it has a very wide range and the population seems to be steady, so the International Union for Conservation of Nature has rated its conservation status as being of "least concern".

References

whiskered myiobius
Birds of the Amazon Basin
Birds of the Guianas
Birds of Brazil
Birds of the Atlantic Forest
whiskered myiobius
whiskered myiobius
Taxonomy articles created by Polbot